Sahasa Samrat  is a 1987 Telugu-language action drama film, produced by K. C. Shekar Babu under the Devi Kamal Movies banner and directed by K. Raghavendra Rao. The film stars Nandamuri Balakrishna, Vijayashanti  and music composed by Chakravarthy. The film was recorded as a flop at the box office.

The movie was at the center of major controversy during its making. The movie was initially titled Samrat. Veteran actor Krishna held the rights to that title and decided to make a movie (introducing his elder son Ramesh Babu) with the same title. He asked the producer K. C. Sekhar Babu to refrain from using that title. Sekhar Babu did not oblige and for a while, there were 2 movies with the same title (Samrat) in production at the same time. Finally, the industry bigwigs intervened and a reluctant Sekhar Babu changed the title of this movie to Sahasa Samrat just a few days before its release. Both this movie and Samrat made by Krishna bombed at the box office, rendering the title war meaningless.

Plot
The film begins in a village where Ramudu a callow is raised by his grandmother. Everyone in the village likes him due to his amicable nature. Moreover, he is a trustworthy servant to a wise person Raghavaiah. Besides, Paidi Kondaiah  a malicious, carries out several barbarities in the village along with his son Gallibabu. Meanwhile, Rani the daughter of Raghavaiah returns, completing her studies and she falls for Ramudu. Both of them decide to couple up secretly due to fear of Rani's rapacious mother Rathalu. Just before, Rathalu approaches Paidi Kondaiah with his help she sentences Ramudu. Here, Ramudu is safeguarded by an advocate Chakradhar Rao a double amputee who is also a victim of Paidi Kondaiah's cruelty. Right now, Chakradhar Rao civilizes Ramudu and establishes him as a master of all fields within 6 months. Thereafter, he returns with a new identity Samrat and bars Paidi Kondaiah's violations. Once, Chakradhar Rao starts narrating his past, he used to live with his brother-in-law Chandra Shekar an honest police officer, and sister Seeta. On the occasion of a temple celebration, Chandra Shekar has been appointed to escort the jewelry which is heisted by Paidi Kondaiah and slandered by Chandra Shekar for the deed. Due to this, Chandra Shekar & Seeta committed suicide leaving their child alone. Thereupon, avenged Chakradhar Rao's assault on Paidi Kondaiah when he amputated him. Soon after the flashback, the old woman reveals that his nephew is Ramudu only one whom she has adopted. At last, Ramudu ceases the evildoers. Finally, the movie ends on a happy note with the marriage of Ramudu & Rani.

Cast

Nandamuri Balakrishna as Ramudu 
Vijayashanti as Rani
Rao Gopal Rao as Raghavaiah
Gollapudi Maruti Rao as Advocate Chakradhar Rao
Nutan Prasad as Paidi Kondaiah
Sudhakar as Gallibabu
Chalapathi Rao as Bandodu
Rallapalli as Paramanamdam  
Rajesh as Malligadu
Sridhar as Inspector Chandra Shekar
Hema Sundar as Serabhaiah
P. J. Sarma as S. P. Venkateswara Rao
Chitti Babu as Chitti
Chidatala Appa Rao as Krishna Murthy
Telephone Satyanarayana as Judge
Dham
Rama Prabha as Rathalu
Mucharlla Aruna as Sampangi
Varalakshmi 
Shubha as Seeta
Y. Vijaya as Tamalapaaku
Nirmalamma as Ramudu's grandmother

Soundtrack

Music composed by Chakravarthy. Lyrics are written by Veturi. The Song Suvvi Gopalude is a chartbuster. The music released on AVM Audio Company.

References

1987 films
1980s Telugu-language films
Films directed by K. Raghavendra Rao
Films scored by K. Chakravarthy